Namaq (also Romanized as Nāmeq; also known as Nāmah-i-Haq, Nāmah-i-Haqq, Namagh, and Nemāḩaq) is a village in Barkuh Rural District, Kuhsorkh County, Razavi Khorasan Province, Iran. At the 2006 census, its population was 1,134, in 403 families.

Sheikh Ahmad-e Jami was born there in 1048.

Historical sites, ancient artifacts and tourism

Namaq Cemetery 

The Namaq Cemetery is a historical cemetery related to the Safavid dynasty and is located in Kuhsorkh County.

Namaq Castle 

Namaq Castle is a historical castle located in Namaq in Razavi Khorasan Province, the longevity of which dates back to before of the mongol conquest.

References 

Populated places in Kuhsorkh County